Sky KG Airlines is a charter airline and aviation service provider headquartered in Bishkek, Kyrgyzstan.

Fleet
As of September 2020, the airline's fleet consisted of the following aircraft, however as of December 2022 there are no longer any aircraft associated to Sky KG:

1 Boeing 747-400
2 Tupolev Tu-204

References 

Airlines of Kyrgyzstan
Airlines banned in the European Union
Airlines established in 2004
2004 establishments in Kyrgyzstan